= Wallace's Castle =

Former Scottish castle

Wallace’s Castle
- Aberdeenshire, Scotland

Location
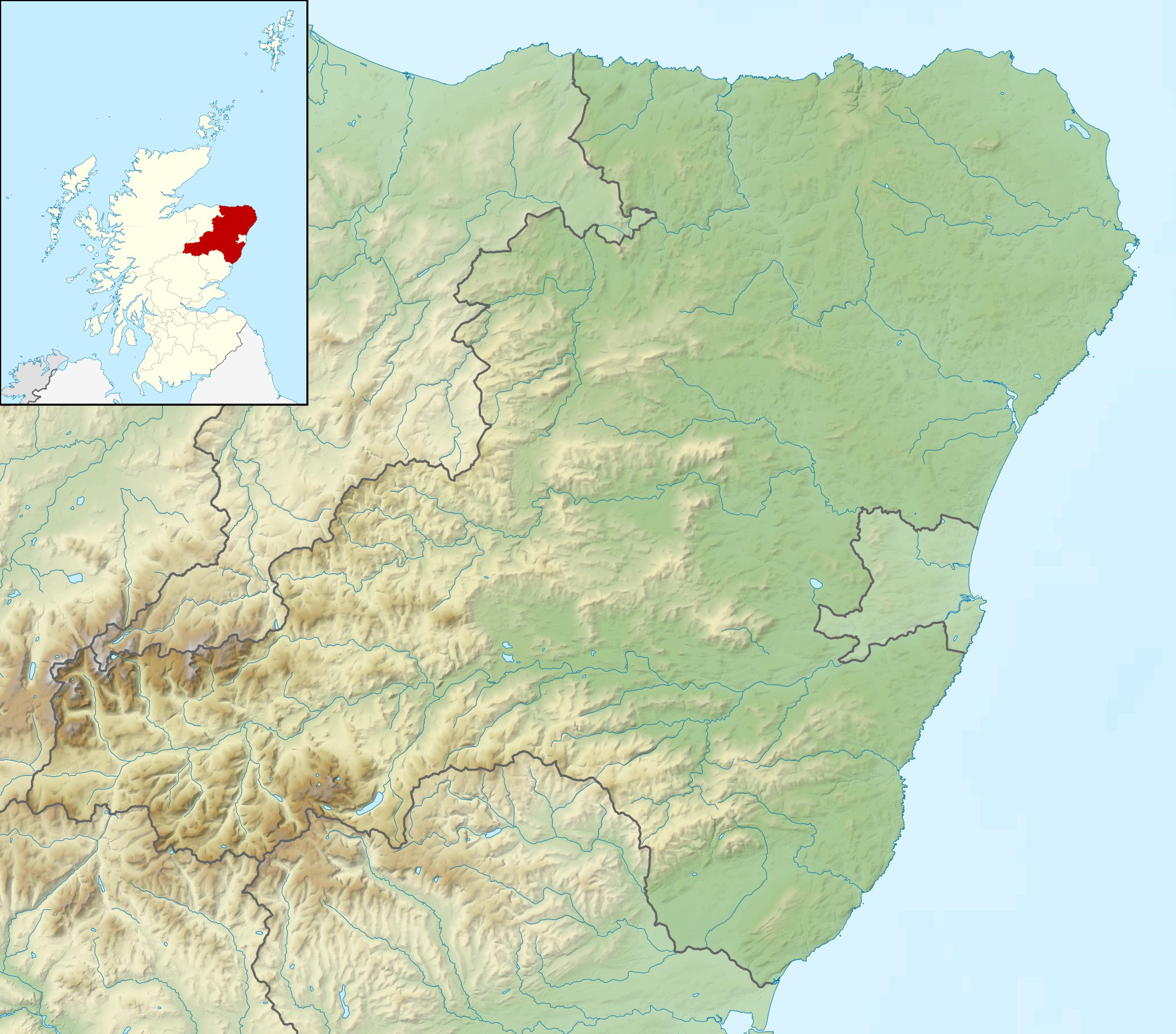
- Wallace’s Castle
- Coordinates: 57.63411788°N 2.380203182°W

Wallace's Castle (Note: Also known as Pitgair Castle or Wallace Tower) is a ruined castle located in Aberdeenshire, Scotland.

Located in the glen of Minonie, two fragments of wall remain of the castle. The castle was held by the Smith family in the 18th century.
